Eastern Suburbs Cricket Club is a cricket club based in the Eastern Suburbs of Sydney, New South Wales, Australia. They are also known as the Eastern Suburbs or latterly Easts Cricket Club and play in the Sydney Grade Cricket competition. Known for over a century as Waverley Cricket Club, it was formally established in 1878. Eastern Suburbs Cricket Club (Waverley) Incorporated (ESCC) has been a community cricket club since 1894.

See also
 History of Australian cricket

References

External links
 

Sydney Grade Cricket clubs
Cricket clubs established in 1894
1894 establishments in Australia
Bondi, New South Wales
Waverley, New South Wales